Termianak (also Romanized as Termīānak, Tarmiyanak, Tormeyānak, and Tormīānk) is a village in Khorram Rud Rural District, in the Central District of Tuyserkan County, Hamadan Province, Iran. At the 2006 census, its population was 475, in 113 families.

References 

Populated places in Tuyserkan County